This is a list of films produced by the Bollywood film industry based in Mumbai in 1966.

Top-grossing films
The top ten grossing films at the Indian Box Office in 1966:

A-Z

References

External links
 Bollywood films of 1966 at the Internet Movie Database

1966
Bollywood
Films, Bollywood